Helopeltarium is a genus of water scavenger beetle in the family Hydrophilidae represented by only one species. It is known only from Myanmar.

Taxonomy 
The genus Helopeltarium was described for the first time by Armand d’Orchymont in 1943. The genus is represented by only one species known from two specimens.

Description 
Small beetles (2.8 mm), strongly dorsoventrally flattened, orange-brown in coloration; pronotum and elytra laterally explanate. A more complete diagnosis was presented by Girón and Short.

Species 

 Helopeltarium ferrugineum d’Orchymont, 1943

References 

Hydrophilidae